Peterson Creek may refer to one of the following rivers:

In Canada
Peterson Creek (Cataraqui River), in Frontenac and Leeds and Grenville counties, Ontario
Peterson Creek (Clyde River), in Frontenac and Lanark counties, Ontario

In the United States
Peterson Creek (San Mateo County, California)
Peterson Creek (South Branch Little Wolf River tributary), a stream in Wisconsin